"Heaven" is a song recorded by German dance act U96, released in April 1996 as the lead single from their fourth album by the same name. The song reached the top 10 in Austria, Finland, Germany, Hungary, Norway and Sweden. The vocals are sung by singer Dea-Li (a.k.a. Dorothy Lapi). The song has a similar chorus to Cyndi Lauper's song "Time After Time", in which she was given a writing credit.

Chart performance
"Heaven" was successful on the charts in Europe, becoming one of the act's biggest hits. It made the top 10 in Austria (number two), Finland, Germany, Hungary, Norway and Sweden. Additionally, the single peaked within the top 20 in Denmark, the Netherlands and Switzerland, as well as on the Eurochart Hot 100, where it hit number 11 in July 1996. In the United Kingdom, "Heaven" was U96's last single to chart there, ending up at number 87 on the UK Singles Chart, on November 24, 1996. In Scotland, it peaked at number 82. The single earned a gold record in Germany.

Music video
The accompanying music video for "Heaven" was directed by Paul Morgans. He also directed the video for "Club Bizarre".

Track listings

 12" maxi
 "Heaven" (Prophecy Mix) — 6:07
 "Heaven" (French Kiss Mix) — 4:54
 "Boot II" (Volle Fahrt Voraus Mix) — 4:46
				
 CD single
 "Heaven" (Video Version) — 3:36
 "Heaven" (French Kiss Version) — 4:54
	
 CD maxi
 "Heaven" (Radio Edit) — 3:36
 "Heaven" (Klubbheads Remix) — 6:18
 "Heaven" (Xenomania Club Mix) — 7:30
 "Heaven" (George Morel Mix) — 6:49
 "Heaven" (Prophecy Mix) — 6:07
 "Heaven" (French Kiss Mix) — 4:54

 CD maxi - Remixes
 "Heaven" (DB 600 Remix) — 7:30
 "Heaven" (Raver's Nature Remix) — 5:52
 "Heaven" (George Morel Remix) — 6:49

Charts and sales

Weekly charts

Year-end charts

Certifications

References

1996 songs
1996 singles
Song recordings produced by Alex Christensen
Songs written by Cyndi Lauper
Songs written by Alex Christensen
U96 songs